The M.I.N.K. Collegiate Baseball League is a collegiate summer baseball league consisting of nine teams. Currently, seven teams are from Missouri, two from Iowa. The league was formed in 2009 and is affiliated within the National Baseball Congress.

History
The M.I.N.K. name derives from the 1910-1913 Missouri-Iowa-Nebraska-Kansas League minor league of the same name. That league used the acronym M.I.N.K., as teams were represented by Missouri, Iowa, Nebraska and Kansas.

The Carroll Merchants moved from the MINK to the Pioneer Collegiate Baseball League after the 2016 season.

In November, 2019, The M.I.N.K. Collegiate Baseball League announced that Des Moines, Iowa and Chanute, Kansas would join the M.I.N.K in 2020, forming a nine team league, with the departure of the Ozark Generals.

On May 27, 2020, the MINK League announced the cancellation of the 2020 season due to COVID-19.

The league notes that: "All MINK Baseball League players are unpaid in order to maintain their NCAA eligibility. Each team is operated in a similar to a professional minor league baseball team, providing players an opportunity to play under the same conditions using wood bats, minor league specification baseballs, experiencing overnight road trips and playing an intense summer league schedule."

Prior to the M.I.N.K., the Clarinda A's won the 1981 National Baseball Congress World Series. The Nevada Griffons were runners up in 1997 and 1998.

Teams

Former teams

 Branson Merchants

 Excelsior Springs Cougars
 Omaha Diamond Spirit

Champions

Notable alumni
Tony Cingrani Clarinda
 Von Hayes Clarinda
 Ozzie Smith Clarinda

References

External links 
MINK League
 
  

Summer baseball leagues
College sports in Missouri
Baseball leagues in Missouri
Baseball leagues in Iowa
College baseball leagues in the United States
Sports leagues established in 2009
2009 establishments in the United States
Baseball leagues in Kansas